Olazábal is a Basque surname. Notable people with the surname include:

 Tirso Olazábal Lardizábal (1842–1921), Spanish politician
 Juan Olazábal Ramery (1860–1937), Spanish politician
 José María Olazábal (born 1966), Spanish golfer
 Oier Olazábal (born 1989), Spanish footballer

Basque-language surnames